The Cancionero de Segovia or Cancionero Musical de Segovia (CMS) (Segovia Cathedral, Archivo Capitular, s.s. [antiguo18]), also known as Cancionero of the Segovia Cathedral, is a manuscript containing Renaissance music from the end of the 15th century and beginning of the 16th century. It contains a wide repertoire of works by mainly Spanish, French and Franco-Flemish composers. It is kept at the Segovia Cathedral Archives.

The manuscript 
The cancionero was compiled by the end of the reign of Isabel the Catholic, between 1499 and 1503. Afterwards it belonged to the Library of the Real Fortress of Segovia, from where it was transferred at an unknown date to the Segovia Cathedral. This was a fortunate move, because the Real Fortress was destroyed by a fire in 1862, along with its library and all things therein.

In 1922, the manuscript was found by Higinio Anglés in the Chapterhouse Archives of the Segovia Cathedral.

The codex contains 228 numbered folios of average size (291 mm x 215 mm), being the area written of 239 mm x 166 mm. Unlike other cancioneros of the period, it does not have a table of contents, neither are the works grouped by musical genre (romance, motet, etc.)

The cancionero is divided into two parts:
 The first part, up to the folio 206, contains more than 150 works of the Franco-Flemish repertoire. 
 The second part, from folios 207 through 228, begins with an inscription that reads "Aquj comjensan las obras castellanas" (here begin the Castilian works). This part contains 40 works, 37 of which are in Spanish, two in Latin (Pange lingua and Ave, Rex noster) and one with no text.

The works 
The codex comprises 204 works in total, in five different languages (74 in Latin, 50 in French, 38 in Spanish, 34 in Flemish/Dutch and 8 in Italian). Of them, 97 are unica, i.e., only found in this source. So far, 27 composers have been identified, but the authorship of a few works remain anonymous. Following is a list of the known composers, with number of works in parentheses:

The Segovia songbook contains both sacred and secular works. Among the genres found in it, there are masses, motets, villancicos, chansons and instrumental pieces. Their complexity ranges from very simple to very difficult.

List of works 

(*) Instrumental version

Concordance with other musical sources

Manuscripts 
 Q16 - Bologna, Civico Museo Bibliografico Musicale, MS Q16 (I-Bc Q 16)
 Q17 - Bologna, Civico Museo Bibliografico Musicale, MS Q17 (I-Bc Q 17)
 Q18 - Bologna, Civico Museo Bibliografico Musicale, MS Q18 (I-Bc Q 18)
 CME - Elvas, Biblioteca Municipal Publia Hortensia, Ms 11793 (Cancioneiro de Elvas) (P-Em 11793)
 176 - Florence, Biblioteca Nazionale Centrale, Ms. Magl. XIX. 176 (I-Fn Magl.XIX 176)
 178 - Florence, Biblioteca Nazionale Centrale, Ms. Magl. XIX. 178 (I-Fn Magl.XIX 178)
 235 - Florence, Biblioteca Riccardiana, MS. 2356 (I-Fr 2356)
 CML - Lisbon, Biblioteca Nacional Colecçao Dr. Ivo Cruz, MS 60 (Cancioneiro de Lisboa) (P-Ln Res C.I.C. 60)
 CMP - Madrid, Biblioteca Real, MS II - 1335 (Cancionero de Palacio)
 831 - Oxford, Bodleian Library, MS. Ashmole 831 (GB-Ob Ashmole 831)
 PIX - Paris, Bibliothèque Nationale, fonds française 15123 (Chansonnier Pixérécourt) (F-Pn 15123)
 M36 - Perugia, Biblioteca Comunale Augusta, Ms. 36 (I-PEc M 36)
 431 - Perugia, Biblioteca Comunale Augusta, Ms. 431 (olim G20) (I-PEc 431)
 I27 - Rome, Biblioteca Apostolica Vaticana, C. G.XIII. 2 7 (Cappella Giulia Chansonnier) (V-CVbav CG XIII.27 ).
 CMC - Seville, Catedral Metropolitana, Biblioteca Capitular y Colombina, Ms. 7-I-28 (Cancionero de la Colombina) (E-S 7-I-28)
 757 - Verona, Biblioteca Capitolare. MS 752 (I-VEcap 757)

Printed books 
 HAR - Harmonice Musices Odhecaton. 1501. Ottaviano Petrucci. Venice
 FRO - Frottole [libro secondo, Naples, Caneto, 1516?] (Florence, Biblioteca Marucelliana)
 DEF - João IV de Portugal, Defensa de la música moderna (Lisbon, 1649)
 UPS - Villancicos de diversos autores. Jerónimo Scotto. Venice. 1556. (Cancionero de Upsala)

Discography 

 1981 - [ANT] Obra Musical Completa de Juan del Enzina. Miguel Á. Tallante. Pro Mvsica Antiqva de Madrid and soloists. New edition (1990): MEC 1024 a 1027 CD
 ???? - [MAY] Mayrat. El Viaje del Agua. Grupo Odres. Saga WKPD-10/2035.  
 1960 - [ANG] Victoria de los Ángeles - Spanish Songs of the Renaissance. Victoria de los Ángeles. Ars Musicae de Barcelona. José María Lamaña. Also found in CD: Victoria de los Ángeles - Cantos de España. EMI Classics 7243 5 66 937 2 2 (4 CD).  
 1968 - [VIC] Songs of Andalusia. Victoria de los Ángeles. Ars Musicae de Barcelona. Enrique Gispert. Also found in CD: Victoria de los Ángeles - Cantos de España. EMI Classics 7243 5 66 937 2 2 (4 CD).  
 1970 - [EMC] Music of the Royal Courts of Europe 1150-1600. Early Music Consort of London. David Munrow. Re-issued in CD as: The Pleasures of the Royal Courts. Elektra Nonesuch 9 71326-2. 
 1971 - [VAL] El Camino de Santiago. Cantos de peregrinación. Escolanía y Capilla Musical de la Abadía del Valle de los Caídos. Leoncio Diéguez. Laurentino Saenz de Buruaga. Cuarteto y Grupo de Instrumentos Antiguos Renacimiento. Ramón Perales de la Cal. EMI (Odeón) 7243 5 67051 2 8.  
 1974 - [BER] Old Spanish Songs. Spanish songs from the Middle Ages and Renaissance. Teresa Berganza. Narciso Yepes. Also found in CD: Canciones españoles. Deutsche Grammophon 435 648-2.  
 1976 - [MUN] The Art of the Netherlands. Early Music Consort of London. David Munrow.  
 1984 - [COM] Romeros y Peregrinos. Grupo Universitario de Cámara de Compostela. Carlos Villanueva Abelairas. EMI Classics CB-067.  
 1985 - [REN] Mon Amy. Ensemble Renaissance. Al Segno as 2004 2.  
 1987 - [KIN] Music from the Spanish Kingdoms. Circa 1500 Ensemble. CRD 3447.  
 1988 - [RIC] Music from the time of Richard III. Yorks Waits. Saydisc CD-SDL 364.  
 1989 - [HEN] Sacred and Secular Music from six centuries. The Hilliard Ensemble. Hyperion Helios CDH 55148.  
 1990 - [ZIR] Francisco de la Torre. La Música en la Era del Descubrimiento. Volume 6. Taller Ziryab. Dial Discos. 
 1991 - [PAL] El Cancionero de Palacio, 1474-1516. Música en la corte de los Reyes Católicos. Hespèrion XX. Jordi Savall. Astrée (Naïve) ES 9943.  
 1991 - [HES] Juan del Encina: Romances y villancicos. Jordi Savall. Hespèrion XX. Astrée (Naïve) ES 9925.  
 1991 - [COL] El Cancionero de la Colombina, 1451-1506. Música en el tiempo de Cristóbal Colón. Hespèrion XX. Jordi Savall. Astrée (Naïve) ES 9954.  
 1991 - [DAE] El Cancionero de la Catedral de Segovia. Ensemble Daedalus. Roberto Festa. Accent ACC 9176.  
 1991 - [HIL] Spanish and Mexican Renaissance Vocal Music. Music in the Age of Columbus / Music in the New World. Hilliard Ensemble. EMI Reflexe 54341 (2 CD).  
 1992 - [WAV] 1492 - Music from the age of discovery. Waverly Consort. Michael Jaffee. EMI Reflexe 54506.  
 1993 - [ALT] In Gottes Namen fahren wir. Pilgerlieder aus Mittelalter und Renaissance. Odhecaton, Ensemble für alte Musik, Köln. FSM 97 208.  
 1993 - [GOT] The Voice in the Garden. Spanish Songs and Motets, 1480-1550. Gothic Voices. Christopher Page. Hyperion 66653.  
 1995 - [LAN] Landscapes. Three centuries of world music. David Bellugi et al. Frame 9506.  
 1995 - [RON] A Song of David. Music of the Sephardim and Renaissance Spain. La Rondinella. Dorian Discovery DIS-80130.  
 1995 - [CAN] Canciones, Romances, Sonetos. From Juan del Encina to Lope de Vega. La Colombina. Accent 95111.  
 1996 - [EGB] Sola m'ire. Cancionero de Palacio. Ensemble Gilles Binchois. Dominique Vellard. Virgin Veritas 45359.  
 1996 - [PIF] Los Ministriles. Spanish Renaissance Wind Music. Piffaro, The Renaissance Band. Archiv Produktion 474 232-2.  
 1996 - [ACC] Cancionero Musical de Palacio. Ensemble Accentus. Thomas Wimmer. Naxos 8.553536.  
 1998 - [FIC] De Antequara sale un moro. Musique de l'Espagne chrétienne, maure et juive vers 1492. Ensemble Música Ficta. Carlos Serrano. Jade 74 321 79256-2.  
 1998 - [UFF] Música no tempo das Caravelas. Música Antiga da UFF.
 2000 - [SPI] Pilgerwege. Freiburger Spielleyt. Verlag der Spielleute CD 0003.  
 2000 - [CAR] Carlos V. Mille Regretz: La Canción del Emperador. La Capella Reial de Catalunya. Hespèrion XXI. Jordi Savall. Alia Vox AV 9814.  
 2000 - [PEÑ] Anchieta: Missa Sine Nomine / Salve Regina. Capilla Peñaflorida. Ministriles de Marsias. Josep Cabré. Naxos 8.555772.  
 2001 - [INC] Cançoner del duc de Calàbria. Duos i Exercicis sobre els vuit tons. In Canto. La mà de guido 2043.  
 2001 - [SCH] Amours amours amours. Lautenduos um 1500. Schröder, Young. Harmonia mundi HMC 90 5253.  
 2002 - [DUF] Cancionero. Music for the Spanish Court 1470-1520. The Dufay Collective. Avie AV0005. 
 2002 - [ORL] The Toledo Summit. The Orlando Consort. Harmonia Mundi HMU 907328.  
 2003 - [AGO] Cancionero de Segovia. Manuscrito Musical s.s. del Archivo de la Catedral. Coral Ágora de Segovia. (Información en coralagora.com)
 2003 - [PAN] La Conquista de Granada - Isabel la Católica. Las Cortes europeas, los Cancioneros y Música Andalusí Nazarí. Música Antigua. Eduardo Paniagua. Pneuma PN-660. 
 2004 - [CAP] Isabel I, Reina de Castilla. Luces y Sombras en el tiempo de la primera gran Reina del Renacimiento 1451-1504. La Capella Reial de Catalunya y Hespèrion XXI. Jordi Savall. Alia Vox AV 9838 (CD). Alia Vox AVSA 9838 (SACD-H).  
 2004 - [CDM] Cancionero de Palacio. Capella de Ministrers. Carles Magraner. Licanus CDM 0409.  
 2005 - [CAB] Juan de Anchieta: Missa Rex Virginum - Motecta. Capilla Peñaflorida. Josep Cabré. K 617
 2006 - [MAG] Borgia. Música religiosa en torno al papa Alejandro VI (1492-1503). Capella de Ministrers. Carles Magraner. Licanus CDM 0616.  
 2007 - [ODH] Peñalosa: Un Libro de Horas de Isabel La Católica. Odhecaton. Paolo Da Col. Bongiovanni 5623.  
 2011 - [MOR] GLOSAS: Embellished Renaissance Music. More Hispano. Vicente Parrilla. Carpe Diem CD-16285.

Bibliography 

 Historia de la música española. Vol 2. Desde el Ars Nova hasta 1600. Samuel Rubio. Alianza Editorial. Madrid. 1983
 de Lama de la Cruz, V. Cancionero Musical de la Catedral de Segovia. Junta de Castilla y León. Salamanca, 1994.
 Perales de la Cal, Ramón (ed.). Cancionero de la Catedral de Segovia. Ed. facsímil. Caja de Ahorros y Monte de Piedad de Segovia. Segovia, 1977
 Anglès, Higinio. La música en la corte de los Reyes Católicos, MME, i, 1941
 Anglès, Higinio. Un manuscrit inconnu avec polyphonie du XVe siècle conservé à la cathédrale de Ségovie, AcM, viii, 1936
 Sohns, Eduardo (ed.). Cancionero de la Catedral de Segovia - Obras castellanas (Eduardo Sohns, Buenos Aires, 1999) 
 Sohns, Eduardo (ed.). Cancionero de la Catedral de Segovia - Dúos (Eduardo Sohns, Buenos Aires, 2002) 
 Sohns, Eduardo (ed.). Cancionero de la Catedral de Segovia - De tous biens playne: siete versiones de una chanson (Eduardo Sohns, Buenos Aires, 1999) 
 Baker, N.K. An Unnumbered Manuscript of Polyphony in the Archives of the Cathedral of Segovia: its Provenance and History. U. of Maryland, 1978
 González Cuenca, Joaquín. Cancionero de la catedral de Segovia. Textos poéticos castellanos. Museo de Ciudad Real, Ciudad Real, 1980.

External links 

15th-century manuscripts
16th-century manuscripts